Simha Jodi (Kannada: ಸಿಂಹ ಜೋಡಿ) is a 1980 Indian Kannada film, directed by Joe Simon and produced by A. R. Raju. The film stars Vishnuvardhan, Manjula, Halam and Roopadevi in lead roles. The film had musical score by Chellapilla Satyam. Actress Roopadevi made her Kannada debut in this movie in which she played Vishnuvardhan's sister (credited as A.Roopa).

Cast

Vishnuvardhan
Manjula
Halam
Roopadevi - credited as A. Roopa
Shanthamma
Shashirakha
Shantha
Baby Rekha
Baby Geetha
Baby Vijayadev
Master Babu
Dheerendra Gopal
Dinesh
Musuri Krishnamurthy
Jai Jagadish
Prabhakar
Hanumanthachar
Sundar Krishna Urs in Guest Appearance
Leelavathi in Guest Appearance
Chethan Ramarao in Guest Appearance

References

External links
 
 

1980 films
1980s Kannada-language films
Films scored by Satyam (composer)